The 1975 winners of the Torneo di Viareggio (in English, the Viareggio Tournament, officially the Viareggio Cup World Football Tournament Coppa Carnevale), the annual youth football tournament held in Viareggio, Tuscany, are listed below.

Format

The 16 teams are seeded in 4 groups. Each team from a group meets the others in a single tie. The winner of each group progress to the final knockout stage.

Participating Teams
Italian teams

  Cesena
  Fiorentina
  Juventus
  Lazio
  Milan
  Napoli
  Sampdoria
  Varese

European teams

  Dukla Praha
  Stoke City
  Újpest Dózsa
  Velež Mostar
  Amsterdam
  Offenbach
  Rangers

American teams
  Burlingame

Group stage

Group A

Group B

Group C

Group D

Knockout stage

Champions

Footnotes

External links
 Official Site (Italian)
 Results on RSSSF.com

1975
1974–75 in Italian football
1974–75 in Yugoslav football
1974–75 in German football
1974–75 in Dutch football
1974–75 in English football
1974–75 in Scottish football
1974–75 in Hungarian football
1974–75 in Czechoslovak football
1975 in American soccer